Nadia Lalami Laaroussi (born 28 April 1990) is a Moroccan former professional tennis player.

In her career, she won two singles titles and two doubles titles on the ITF Women's Circuit. On 19 September 2011, she reached her best singles ranking of world No. 322. On 29 August 2011, she peaked at No. 427 in the doubles rankings.

Playing for Morocco Fed Cup team, Lalami has a win–loss record of 18–12.

Career
At the 2011 Grand Prix SAR La Princesse Lalla Meryem in Fes, she upset the top seed and world No. 24, Aravane Rezaï, in the second round, becoming the first Moroccan player to reach the quarterfinals of a WTA tournament.

ITF finals

Singles (2–2)

Doubles (2–4)

References

External links
 
 
 

1990 births
Living people
Sportspeople from Casablanca
Moroccan female tennis players
Mediterranean Games bronze medalists for Morocco
Competitors at the 2009 Mediterranean Games
Mediterranean Games medalists in tennis
20th-century Moroccan women
21st-century Moroccan women